Eucalyptus willisii, also known as shining peppermint or promontory peppermint, is a species of small to medium-sized tree, sometimes a mallee that is endemic to Victoria, Australia. It has rough, fibrous bark on the trunk and branches, lance-shaped to curved adult leaves, flower buds in groups of eleven to twenty five, white flowers and cup-shaped or hemispherical fruit.

Description
It has rough, fibrous bark on the trunk and larger branches. Flowering occurs from September to January and the flowers are white. The seeds are smooth and glossy, brown to dark brown and pyramid-shaped but are distorted along one curved face.

Taxonomy and naming
Eucalyptus willisii was first formally described in 1983 by Pauline Ladiges, Chris Humphries and Ian Brooker in the Australian Journal of Botany from specimens collected near Mount Oberon in Wilsons Promontory National Park in 1982. The specific epithet (willisii) honours James Hamlyn Willis (1910 – 1995).

Distribution
The shining peppermint is endemic to Victoria from Cranbourne to around Bairnsdale in the west, and south to Wilsons Promontory where it is found growing in sandy areas or on granite hills in scrubland communities.

See also
List of Eucalyptus species

References

Trees of Australia
willisii
Myrtales of Australia
Flora of Victoria (Australia)
Taxa named by Ian Brooker
Plants described in 1983